= Phagun (Nepali calendar) =

Eleventh month in the Bikram Samwat

Phāgun (Nepali:फागुन) is the eleventh month in the Bikram Samwat, the official Nepali calendar. This month coincides with February 13 to March 13 in the Gregorian calendar, and is 29 days long.

Important events during this month:

- February 16: Phāgun 4, Maha Shivaratri
- March 3 and 4: Phāgun 19 and 20, Phāgu Purnima
